Two ships of the Japanese Navy have been named Aotaka:

 , a  launched in 1903 and stricken in 1923
 , a  launched in 1940 and sunk in 1944

Imperial Japanese Navy ship names
Japanese Navy ship names